For other people named Thomas Byrne, see Thomas Byrne (disambiguation)

Thomas Joseph Byrne (December 31, 1919 – December 20, 2007) was an American left-handed starting pitcher in Major League Baseball who played for four American League teams from  through , primarily the New York Yankees. He also played for the St. Louis Browns (1951–52), Chicago White Sox (1953) and Washington Senators (1953). Byrne batted and threw left-handed.

Education and military service
Byrne attended the Baltimore City College high school and Wake Forest College. In November 1943, Byrne was commissioned an ensign in the United States Navy and was stationed at Naval Training Station Norfolk, Virginia. In 1944, he reported to the destroyer USS Ordronaux (DD-617) to serve as the gunnery officer, with a deployment to the Mediterranean Sea during World War II.

Baseball career
Byrne was a hard-thrower pitcher who never hesitated to pitch inside, but he had really struggled with his control most of his career, earning him the nickname "Wild Man".
After making his debut on April 27, 1943, he had four years with more than 130 innings pitched and more than 6 walks per nine innings, a record later tied by Nolan Ryan. Byrne led the league in hit batsmen five times and in walks three times.

But Byrne was a dangerous hitter. He hit well enough during his career to be called on by his managers for pinch-hitting duties. He batted .238 in his career (143-for-601) with 14 home runs and 98 RBI in 377 games, including two grand slams and 80 pinch hits.

In a 13-year career, Byrne posted an 85–69 record with a 4.11 ERA in 1362 innings. He had a disappointing 0.74 strikeout-to-walk ratio (766-to-1037). In four World Series, he went 2–2 with 11 strikeouts and a 2.53 ERA in 21.1 innings. He played his final regular-season game on September 21, 1957, before ending his career in the World Series defeat to the Milwaukee Braves.

Later life
After the conclusion of his baseball career, Byrne returned to Wake Forest, North Carolina, where he had attended college (although the college had since relocated to Winston-Salem). Prior to the 1963 season, he joined the New York Mets organization as a minor league scout. When Clyde McCullough was promoted to the Mets as a coach, Byrne took over the manager's job for the Raleigh Mets of the Carolina League. He managed the team from July 29 through the end of the season.

Byrne later became mayor of Wake Forest from 1973 through 1987. He died on December 20, 2007, at age 87 in Wake Forest, North Carolina, eleven days before his 88th birthday.

See also

List of Major League Baseball career hit batsmen leaders

References

External links

1919 births
2007 deaths
American League All-Stars
American athlete-politicians
Baltimore City College alumni
Baseball players from Baltimore
Charleston Senators players
Chicago White Sox players
Kansas City Blues (baseball) players
Lácteos de Pastora players
Major League Baseball pitchers
Mayors of places in North Carolina
United States Navy personnel of World War II
New York Yankees players
Newark Bears (IL) players
Seattle Rainiers players
St. Louis Browns players
Sportspeople from Manhattan
Baseball players from New York City
Washington Senators (1901–1960) players
Wake Forest University alumni
20th-century American politicians
People from Wake Forest, North Carolina
United States Navy officers